Triple Crown Records is a New York-based rock music record label created in 1997 by Fred Feldman. The label features such artists as The Receiving End of Sirens and The Dear Hunter, and launched the career of Brand New in 2001. It is a part of the Eastwest family of record labels, a subsidiary of Warner Music Group, and is distributed by the Alternative Distribution Alliance.

Current bands
 Adjy
 Caspian
 Covet
 Dogleg
 Foxing
 Free Throw
 From Indian Lakes
 Future Teens
 Heart Attack Man
 Holy Fawn
 Into It. Over It.
 Kississippi
 Moving Mountains
 Oso Oso
 Shortly
 Sorority Noise
 O'Brother
 You Blew It!

Past bands

 25 Ta Life
 Anterrabae
 As Tall as Lions
 A Will Away
 Bad Books
 Brand New
 Brian Bonz
 Cavetown
 Comin' Correct
 The Dear Hunter
 Death Threat
 E.Town Concrete
 Fight Fair
 Fireworks
 Folly
 The Gay Blades
 Hit the Lights
 Honor Bright
 Hot Rod Circuit
 Kevin Devine
 King Django
 Lounge
 Lux Courageous
 McCafferty
 Mushmouth
 No Redeeming Social Value
 Northstar
 One 4 One
 Orange Island
 Outline
 Outsmarting Simon
 Out to Win
 Overthrow
 Plug in Stereo
 The Receiving End of Sirens
 Safety in Numbers
 Scraps and Heart Attacks
 The Secret Handshake
 Shockwave
 Skarhead
 Skinnerbox
 Small Towns Burn a Little Slower
 Step Lively
 Tiny Moving Parts
 Voice of Reason
 Weatherbox
 Where Fear and Weapons Meet
 xDISCIPLEx A.D.

See also
 List of record labels

References

External links
 Official website

American record labels